Interdictor Cruiser may refer to:
A large ship in the TradeWars 2002 online game
One of several types of starships in Star Wars; see List of Star Wars capital ships